Henry Thomas Powditch (21 May 1894 – 21 January 1963) was an Australian rules footballer who played with Fitzroy in the Victorian Football League (VFL).

Notes

External links 

Harry Powditch's playing statistics from The VFA Project

1894 births
1963 deaths
Australian rules footballers from Melbourne
Fitzroy Football Club players
Northcote Football Club players
People from Footscray, Victoria